Mỹ Hiệp may refer to several rural communes in Vietnam, including:

Mỹ Hiệp, An Giang, a commune of Chợ Mới District, An Giang
Mỹ Hiệp, Bình Định, a commune of Phù Mỹ District
Mỹ Hiệp, Đồng Tháp, a commune of Cao Lãnh District